Cascade is a small town in Western Australia located  east of Perth along the South Coast between Ravensthorpe and Esperance in the Goldfields-Esperance region of Western Australia. At the 2006 census, Cascade had a population of 158.

The origin of the name is unknown except that it was suggested by the Shire of Esperance. The townsite was gazetted on 19 November 1976.
 
The main industry in town is wheat farming with the town being a Cooperative Bulk Handling receival site.

References 

Shire of Esperance
Grain receival points of Western Australia